Sir Alexander Baird of Urie, 1st Baronet, 2nd of Ury, GBE (22 October 1849 – 20 June 1920) was Lord Lieutenant of Kincardineshire from 1889 to 1918 and later served as president of the Permanent Arbitration Board in Egypt.

Biography
Baird was the eldest son of John Baird, 1st of Ury, and wife Margaret Findlay, and elder brother of John Baird, DL, JP, Member of Parliament for North West Lanarkshire.

He was educated at Harrow School.

He spent a large portion of his life in Egypt, and later served as president of the Permanent Arbitration Board in Egypt. He had a house in Mattarieh, just outside Cairo, where he died. He spoke fluent Arabic and was heavily involved in philanthropic projects in the country.

Baird was also Lord Lieutenant of Kincardineshire from 1889 to 1918. He built Ury House, Stonehaven, which eventually passed into the ownership of the Earls of Kintore.

Baird was created a Baronet, of Urie, in the Parish of Fetteresso, in the County of Kincardine, in the Baronetage of the United Kingdom, on 8 March 1897 and appointed a Knight-Grand-Cross of the Most Excellent Order of the British Empire (GBE) in the 1920 civilian war honours for his services in Egypt.

Marriage and issue
Baird married The Hon. Annette Palk, the eldest daughter of the 1st Baron Haldon, on 16 July 1873, and they had seven children: 
 John Lawrence Baird, later 1st Viscount Stonehaven (1874–1947)
 Alexander Walter Frederick Baird (1876–1931), soldier.
 Evelyn Margaret Baird (1875–1926)
 Janet Norah Baird (1878–1943)
 Edith Annette Baird (1880–1881)
 Nina Isabel Baird (1882–1919)
 Muriel Jane Baird (1884–1968)

Nina Isabel Baird ran a carpet factory in Amria, where she employed roughly 300 local women whose husbands had joined the Senussi rebel movement. She died in summer 1919 of Typhoid fever.

References

 Obituary, The Times, 22 June 1920
 Letter from Valentine Chirol, The Times, 23 June 1920

1849 births
1920 deaths
People educated at Harrow School
Baronets in the Baronetage of the United Kingdom
Deputy Lieutenants of Aberdeen
Deputy Lieutenants of Inverness-shire
Knights Grand Cross of the Order of the British Empire
Scottish philanthropists
Lord-Lieutenants of Kincardineshire
British expatriates in Egypt